is an EP by Japanese idol duo Wink, released by Polystar on December 1, 1988. It features the duo's first No. 1 single "Ai ga Tomaranai (Turn It into Love)", a Japanese-language cover of Kylie Minogue's "Turn It into Love". Also included in the EP are covers of Bananarama's "Love in the First Degree" and Sinitta's "Cross My Broken Heart", as well as a remix of the duo's debut single "Sugar Baby Love". The EP was the duo's first release to feature songwriter Neko Oikawa and arranger Motoki Funayama, who would work on the duo's further recordings.

The EP peaked at No. 6 on Oricon's albums chart and sold over 345,000 copies.

Track listing

Charts

References

External links 
 
 
 

1988 debut EPs
Wink (duo) albums
Japanese-language EPs